Dartchery at the 1964 Summer Paralympics consisted of a mixed pairs event.

Medal summary

References 

 

1964 Summer Paralympics events
1964